This is a list of wars and conflicts involving Dutch Guiana and later Suriname from the Dutch colonisation of the Guianas to the present day.

References 

Suriname
 
Wars